Gaggomahal or Gaggo Mahal  is a village close to Teh Ajnala in the district of Amritsar, Punjab, India. Gaggomahal is a village of the Mahal caste.

This village is birthplace of first General of Guru Gobind Singh's army and a warrior named "Bhai Jeevan Singh". When Aurangzeb beheaded the ninth Guru of Sikhism Guru tegh Bahadur in Delhi Chandni chowk than Baba Jaita ji(Baba Jeevan Singh) brought the holy head of Guru tegh Bahadur from Delhi to Anandpur sahib and presented it to Guru Gobind Singh as fulfilled their wish of having darshan(glimpse) of Guru ji (ninth Guru of Sikhism and father of Guru Gobind Singh ji)

Baba Jeevan Singh ji then bestowed with title "'Rangrete 'Guru ke Bete" ("ranghar caste is son of Guru"). In Guru Gobind Singh's army he took part in many battles and last battle which was Chamkaur sahib where he fought along with 40 Sikh and become immortal martyr.

Villages in Amritsar district